Outrider Nunatak is a prominent nunatak (1,250 m) in the north-central portion of the Arkhangel'skiy Nunataks. The feature was photographed from aircraft of U.S. Navy Operation Highjump on January 4, 1947. The summit of the nunatak was intersected by members of the United States Geological Survey (USGS) Topo West Traverse, 1962–63. Named by the New Zealand Geological Survey Antarctic Expedition (NZGSAE), 1963–64, presumably because of its forward position in the group.

Nunataks of Oates Land